The Death of Me is the first solo EP by City and Colour, the pet project of Canadian musician Dallas Green. It was recorded in three days while his band, Alexisonfire, were taking a short break in between tours. Only 2000 copies were pressed and the EPs were only available at his early solo shows in Southern Ontario and is no longer available in print.

Track listing

Personnel
Dallas Green – guitar, vocals, piano, keyboards
Julius Butty – production, engineering, mixing, mastering, tambourine and vibes on "Sometimes (I Wish)"

City and Colour albums
2004 debut EPs
Dine Alone Records albums